The 1954 Kent State Golden Flashes football team was an American football team that represented Kent State University in the Mid-American Conference (MAC) during the 1954 college football season. In their ninth season under head coach Trevor J. Rees, the Golden Flashes compiled an 8–2 record (4–1 against MAC opponents), finished in second place in the MAC, lost to Delaware in the Refrigerator Bowl, and outscored all opponents by a combined total of 331 to 130.

The team's statistical leaders included Lou Mariano with 1,037 rushing yards, Bob Stimac with 434 passing yards, and Bill Whitley with 239 receiving yards. Offensive tackle Joe Barbee was selected as a first-team All-MAC player.

Schedule

References

Kent State
Kent State Golden Flashes football seasons
Kent State Golden Flashes football